This is the Recorded Music NZ list of number-one albums in New Zealand during the 1980s decade. Dire Straits' 1985 album Brothers in Arms spent a total of 21 weeks at No. 1. Split Enz's album Time and Tide was the most successful album by a New Zealand artist, spending a total of six weeks at No. 1. From September 1983 to August 1989, no albums by New Zealand artists reached No. 1.

In New Zealand, Recorded Music NZ compiles the top 40 albums chart each Monday. Over-the-counter sales of both physical and digital formats make up the data. Certifications are awarded for the number of shipments to retailers. Gold certifications are awarded after 7,500 sales, and platinum certifications after 15,000.

The following albums were all number one in New Zealand in the 1980s.

Number ones

Key
 – Number-one album of the year
 – Album of New Zealand origin
 – Number-one album of the year, of New Zealand origin

Notes

References
 Album Top 40 - Charts.org.nz

External links 

 The Official NZ Music Charts

Number-one albums
1980s
New Zealand Albums